The 2019 Grand Prix La Marseillaise was the 40th edition of the Grand Prix La Marseillaise cycle race. It was held on 3 February 2019 as a category 1.1 race on the 2019 UCI Europe Tour. The race started and finished in Marseille.

Teams
Sixteen teams of up to seven riders started the race:

Result

References

2019 in French sport
2019 UCI Europe Tour
Grand Prix La Marseillaise